The women's 20 km race walk at the 2013 Summer Universiade was held on July 10, 2013.

Medalists

Individual

Team

Results

References
Results

20K
2013 in women's athletics
2013